The South Ferry Basin is a tidal basin on the River Mersey, in England, and part of the Port of Liverpool. Situated near the southern dock system, it is only connected directly to the river.

History
The basin was built c.1817–23 for use by fishermen and ferries. Around 1817, the Etna was built for ferrying passengers and vehicles from South Ferry Basin to Tranmere. From 4 April 1865 a ferry service was established between the South Ferry Basin and New Ferry on the Wirral Peninsula, with additional sailings to Liverpool Pier Head. Facilities at the basin consisted of a pontoon moored against the dock wall. The "South End" service appeared to be relatively short-lived, as by 1876, these facilities had been removed and sold for scrap.

This small basin was also known locally as the 'Cocklehole' and was a place that Liverpool ceded to the poor cocklefishers and oystercatchers for the mooring and repair of their boats whilst the main port of Liverpool handled the large trade. It was little known under its own name and often confused as being part of Coburg Dock.

Present
The basin is open to the river and is currently heavily silted up. It isn't used for anything. Although the basin remains unaltered, the surrounding area has since been redeveloped for residential purposes.

References

Sources

External links

 

Liverpool docks